Rosaster is a genus of echinoderms belonging to the family Goniasteridae.

The species of this genus are found in America, Indian Ocean, Malesia.

Species:

Rosaster alexandri 
Rosaster attenuatus 
Rosaster bipunctus 
Rosaster cassidatus 
Rosaster confinis 
Rosaster endilius 
Rosaster florifer 
Rosaster mamillatus 
Rosaster mimicus 
Rosaster nannus 
Rosaster symbolicus

References

Goniasteridae
Asteroidea genera